Community Participation (Participación Comunidad) is a progressive political party in Colombia. 
At the last legislative elections, 10 March 2002, the party won, as one of the many small parties, parliamentary representation.  In the election of 2006, the party won no seats.

Political parties in Colombia
Progressive parties in Colombia